Compass-IGSO1, also known as Beidou-2 IGSO1 is a Chinese navigation satellite which will become part of the Compass navigation system. It was launched in July 2010, and became the fifth Compass satellite to be launched after Compass-M1, G2, G1, and G3.

Compass-IGSO1 was launched at 21:30 GMT on 31 July 2010. The launch used a Long March 3A carrier rocket, flying from the Xichang Satellite Launch Centre. The satellite is developed in the basis of the DFH-3 satellite platform and has a lifespan of 8 years.

Instruments
The primary instrument aboard Compass-IGSO1 is a navigation system operating in the L-band. Compass-IGSO1 is the second satellite of the Compass navigation system with an optical synchronization link. The timing functionality is provided by two instruments on board the space segment, the Laser Time Transfer (LTT) instrument consisting of a corner-cube retroflector array (hexagonal shape 49 × 43 cm, 90 pcs, 33 mm diameter, 770 cm2 reflective area) and a single-photon avalanche diode based detector developed in cooperation with CTU. The ground segment uses the dedicated Chinese satellite laser ranging network. The combination of traditional passive laser ranging with active single photon detection aboard produces data for the ground-to-space oscillator time-base with 10−11 s precision.

See also

2010 in spaceflight
List of passive satellites

References

Spacecraft launched in 2010
Satellites of China